JOJO was a Turkish children's television channel owned by Çukurova Media Group. It was launched on 8 February 2005 and available via the Digiturk platform. Jojobil, Jojomix competitions such as Rally and egg; Strawberry Girl, Cédric, Looney Tunes, Sky Land, Lazy Lucy, Gormiti, Teen Titans, such as cartoons, tribal, and films like Time Travelers, Chief Jojo, and broadcast programs, such as how-to. In addition, Yu-Gi-Oh! and Yu-Gi-Oh Gx as anime are also available. It was then closed for unknown reasons in 2014.

Anime 
 Mermaid Melody Pichi Pichi Pitch

Preschool 
 Babar and the Adventures of Badou
 Doc McStuffins
 Dora and Friends: Into the City!
 Eloise
 Franklin and Friends
 Handy Manny
 Lazy Lucy
 Magic Roundabout
 Mike the Knight
 Poko
 Stuart Little
 Strawberry Girl
 Viva Pinata

Educational 
 Backyard Science
 Chief Jojo
 Finger Tips
 One Minute Wonders
 Spellz
 Tricky TV

Cartoon 
 Angel's Friends (Season 2)
 Baby Looney Tunes
 Batman: The Brave and the Bold (Season 2)
 Carl2
 Cedric
 Code Lyoko
 Dinosaur King
 Dino Squad
 Dragon Ball
 Dragon Ball Z
 Dragon Ball GT
 Dragon Ball Z Kai
 Dragon Hunters
 Funky Cops
 Chaotic
 The Garfield Show
 Gormiti
 Grossology
 Horrid Henry
 Horseland
 Jakers
 Justice League Unlimited
 King Of Cards
 Lola & Virginia
 Martin Mystery
 Monster by Mistake
 My Life Me
 Mew Mew Power
 One Piece
 Pet Pals
 Ruby Gloom
 Sally Bollywood
 Skyland
 Spider-Man (The New Animated Series)
 Stoked
 Sushi Pack
 Tara Duncan
 Teenage Mutant Ninja Turtles
 Teen Titans
 The Amazing Spiez!
 The Looney Tunes Show
 ThunderCats (2011)
 Totally Spies
 Xiaolin Showdown
 Yu-Gi-Oh!
 Yu-Gi-Oh! GX
 Yu-Gi-Oh! 5D's
 Yu-Gi-Oh! Zexal

Series 
 Connor Undercover
 Life With Derek
 Really Me!
 Ruby & The Rockits

Defunct television channels in Turkey
Children's television networks
Children's television channels in Turkey